Two-time defending champion Monica Seles defeated Steffi Graf in the final, 6–2, 3–6, 10–8 to win the women's singles tennis title at the 1992 French Open. Seles became the first woman to win three consecutive French Open titles (later followed by Justine Henin). The final is considered by some to be the greatest French Open match in the Open Era.

Seeds

Qualifying

Draw

Finals

Top half

Section 1

Section 2

Section 3

Section 4

Bottom half

Section 5

Section 6

Section 7

Section 8

References

External links
1992 French Open – Women's draws and results at the International Tennis Federation

Women's Singles
French Open by year – Women's singles
French Open - Women's Singles
1992 in women's tennis
1992 in French women's sport